The Caraguatá River is a river in Uruguay.

Location

It is situated in the north of the country, in the Tacuarembó Department and the Rivera Department, where the river rises.

Fluvial system

It is a tributary of the Tacuarembó River.

The river runs generally from north-west to south-east.

Name
The word 'Caraguatá' originally referred to a local plant.

The name is also shared by a nearby range of hills and two local towns situated in Tacuarembó Department and Rivera Department respectively.

See also

 Cuchilla de Caraguatá#Name
 Geography of Uruguay#Topography and hydrography
 Uruguay#Geography

Rivers of Rivera Department
Rivers of Tacuarembó Department